The 2011 International V8 Supercar Championship (often simplified to the 2011 V8 Supercars Championship) was an FIA sanctioned international motor racing series for V8 Supercars. It was the thirteenth V8 Supercar Championship Series and the fifteenth series in which V8 Supercars contested the premier Australian touring car title. It was the first since the series was elevated to the 'International category' status by the FIA. The championship began on 10 February in the Middle East at Abu Dhabi's Yas Marina Circuit and finished on 4 December at the Homebush Street Circuit. It was contested over 28 races at 14 events. These events were held in all states of Australia and in the Northern Territory as well as in the United Arab Emirates, and New Zealand. The 52nd Australian Touring Car Championship title was awarded to Jamie Whincup by the Confederation of Australian Motor Sport.

Triple Eight Race Engineering Holden driver Jamie Whincup won the championship by 35 points over his teammate Craig Lowndes. The best placed Ford driver was Ford Performance Racing's Mark Winterbottom, 458 points behind Whincup. Stone Brothers Racing driver Shane van Gisbergen finished in fourth, 38 points behind Winterbottom, with the Holden Racing Team's Garth Tander a further 98 points back in fifth.

Whincup won ten races during the course of the season, one shared with French driver Sébastien Bourdais at the Gold Coast. He finished on the podium in nine of the first eleven races, setting up a strong points lead. His teammate Lowndes chipped away at the lead, winning four races in a row in the middle of the season, one with Mark Skaife at Phillip Island, and briefly led the championship after the Bathurst 1000. Lowndes won his fifth race at the title decider in Sydney but this was not enough to take the crown away from Whincup. The other thirteen race wins were shared between eight other drivers. Reigning champion James Courtney won the second race of the year in Abu Dhabi while his teammate Tander won three races, including one race at the Clipsal 500 and the Bathurst 1000 with Nick Percat. Rick Kelly also won three races, taking his first race win since 2008 and the first for Kelly Racing at the Hamilton 400. Van Gisbergen won the first race of his career at the Hamilton 400 before scoring his second at Hidden Valley. Brad Jones Racing were another team to win their first championship race, with Jason Bright taking his first win since 2006 at Barbagallo and backing it up with another win at Winton. Winterbottom took his first win in just under a year at the Gold Coast, winning the Sunday race with British driver Richard Lyons, before winning the final race of the season in Sydney.

Teams and drivers

The following teams and drivers have been confirmed for the 2011 series.

Notes:
 – Dan Wheldon was originally scheduled to drive alongside James Courtney at the Gold Coast 600, but was killed in an accident at the 2011 IZOD IndyCar World Championship one week before the race.
 – Tony D'Alberto was forced to sit out the L&H 500 after being diagnosed with chicken pox. Taz Douglas replaced him for the event.
 – Will Power was due to take part in the Gold Coast 600, but was forced to withdraw after sustaining a back injury at the IZOD IndyCar World Championship.
 – Jason Bright was injured and unable to take part in Race 24 at Symmons Plains. Cameron McConville replaced him for the race. Bright later withdrew from the next race at Sandown, where he was replaced by his endurance co-driver Andrew Jones.
 – Tony Kanaan decided not to participate in the Gold Coast 600 following the death of Dan Wheldon.

Team and driver changes
Trading Post became the naming rights sponsor of the #6 FPR Ford Falcon which will be driven by former Holden Racing Team driver Will Davison.

Tekno Autosports and driver Jonathon Webb ended their association with Dick Johnson Racing to run the team separately with support from Triple Eight Race Engineering.

Walkinshaw Racing downsized to a single-car team, with the #10 Racing Entitlement Contract initially placed for sale, but was subsequently purchased by organising body V8 Supercar Australia to achieve their long-held ambition to reduce the grid to twenty-eight cars.

2010 Walkinshaw Performance endurance co-driver David Reynolds joined Kelly Racing in the #16 Commodore, replacing Tony Ricciardello. Greg Murphy also joined Kelly Racing, replacing the outgoing Jason Bargwanna.

After a long-running dispute over the ownership of Dick Johnson Racing, co-owner Charlie Schwerkolt sold his stake in the team and left with the No. 18 Racing Entitlement Contract, but has leased it back to Dick Johnson Racing for the purposes of running two cars in 2011. James Moffat was later announced as the driver for Car #18.

After previously confirming his departure from the team he won the championship with, James Courtney joined the Holden Racing Team in the place of Will Davison.

Reigning Fujitsu V8 Supercar Series champion Steve Owen was confirmed as the outgoing Greg Murphy's replacement at Paul Morris Motorsport.

Brad Jones Racing was the last team to confirm its driver line-up, with Jason Bargwanna joining the team while Jason Richards was undergoing treatment with Adreno Cortical Carcinoma during the season. Richards died in December 2011.

Tony D'Alberto switched from Holden to Ford for the 2011 season. He ran a Holden Commodore at the season-opening Abu Dhabi race before switching to Ford ahead of the Clipsal 500.

Only two endurance race wild cards were approved for in 2011. Fujitsu Series team Miles Racing applied for one to run Ashley Walsh and Chaz Mostert but the team later elected not to utilise it. Kelly Racing entered a fifth car under the Banner of Shannons Mars Racing in which the winner of the Shannons Supercar Showdown television show competition would co-drive with the shows narrator and experienced driver Grant Denyer. At the shows conclusion a week prior to the Bathurst 1000, leading Formula Ford driver Cameron Waters was announced the winner.

Race calendar
The following events make up the 2011 series. The event at Barbagallo Raceway was reinstated with the Western Australian Government providing $5 million to redevelop the circuit. The Desert 400 was scrapped with V8 Supercars stating that the decision not to hold the event was because the circuit's international racing calendar was too full for an early season date.

Season summary

Jamie Whincup won the opening race of the championship at the Yas V8 400, at the time it was his twelfth consecutive victory in races held outside of Australia, taking in wins in New Zealand, Abu Dhabi and Bahrain going back to the 2008 Gulf Air Desert 400. Whincup won by 14 seconds over the close pair of Alex Davison and Mark Winterbottom who in turn lead another pair of Fords in Shane van Gisbergen and Tim Slade. The second race was considerably more chaotic with a multi-car pile up in the opening laps ruling out amongst others Holden Racing Team's Garth Tander. Tander's new team-mate 2010 champion James Courtney, provided HRT with an opposing result, winning a late race battle with Jason Bright to take the second race win and to gain some points back after receiving the 50 point penalty the day before. Whincup was third ahead of David Reynolds completing an impressive return to the series after sitting out 2010.

Garth Tander won a shortened first race of the Clipsal 500. The race hinged on two safety car periods late in the race caused by incidents involving Russell Ingall and James Moffat. Tander lead Triple Eight Race Engineering team-mates Jamie Whincup and Craig Lowndes across the line at the head of a bunched queue. Jason Bright and Fabian Coulthard saw Holden fill the top five places ahead of Mark Winterbottom. The biggest of the incidents in the race saw Steve Owen crash at turn 8 with sufficient force that car would not be repaired in time for the non-championship Albert Park 400 a week later. Whincup became the first repeat winner for the year by winning the Sunday race by 1.3 seconds over Rick Kelly. The second place for Kelly was the best result since the formation of Kelly Racing in 2009. Ford Performance Racing and Holden Racing Team filled the next few positions with Mark Winterbottom taking third over James Courtney, Garth Tander, Paul Dumbrell and Will Davison. Whincup had diced entertainingly with Will Davison early in the wet conditions, while Turn 8 claimed more cars with Lee Holdsworth and Warren Luff both crashing out, while Bright crashed heavily at the Senna Chicane.

Championship standings

Points system
Points are awarded to the driver or drivers of a car that completes 75% of the race distance and is running at the completion of the final lap. The different points scales adapt to each event, having one, two or three races, making sure that a driver gets 300 points if they win all races of the event.

Notes:

Std. denotes all races except the Trading Post Perth Challenge, Coates Hire Ipswich 300, L&H 500, and the Bathurst 1000. These four events have unique rules.

Trading Post Perth Challenge: This event consisted of three races. The total points were divided between each race evenly.

Coates Hire Ipswich 300: This event consisted of three races. Due to their short length, Races 16 and 17 only awarded half the points of a usual race. Race 18 used the standard points system.

L&H 500:   The Phillip Island event was split into two qualifying races and a 500-kilometre feature race.  The two drivers per team were grouped into separate qualifying races that counted towards drivers' individual point totals and towards the starting grid for the feature race.  The two drivers then shared one car for the 500-kilometre endurance race.

Bathurst:  Two drivers shared one car for the race.

Drivers Championship

Teams Championship

(s) denotes a single-car team.

See also
2011 V8 Supercar season

References

Supercars Championship seasons
International V8 Supercar Championship